The 30th Alaska State Legislature was the meeting of the Alaska Legislature, beginning January 17, 2017.

In the Senate and House elections, neither party gained a seat in the Senate and, leaving a 14–6 majority and maintaining its 35–25 control of the House.

Senate 
Based on the results of the 2016 elections, the Alaska Senate is composed of 6 Democrats and 14 Republicans.

Senate members

Senate President: Pete Kelly (D–A Fairbanks)
Majority Leader: Peter Micciche (R–O Soldotna)
Minority Leader: Berta Gardner (D–I Anchorage)

House members
Based on the results of the 2016 elections, the Alaska House of Representatives was composed of 21 Republicans, 17 Democrats and 2 independents. The Democrats and the independents both gained one seat. The Democrats, two independents and three Republicans caucus together giving the Democratic Party 22-18 majority.

Speaker: Bryce Edgmon (D-37 Dillingham)
Majority Leader: Chris Tuck (D-23 Anchorage)
Minority Leader: Charisse Millett (R-25 Anchorage)

↑ Member was originally appointed.

See also
 List of Alaska State Legislatures
 29th Alaska State Legislature, the legislature preceding this one
 31st Alaska State Legislature, the legislature following this one
 List of governors of Alaska
 List of speakers of the Alaska House of Representatives
 Alaska Legislature
 Alaska Senate
 Alaska State Senate election, 2016
 {AKLeg.gov}

References

2017 in Alaska
Alaska
2018 in Alaska
Alaska
Alaska legislative sessions